Hohenwutzen is a small village in the German state of Brandenburg, located on the Oder river. Since 2003, Hohenwutzen is part of Bad Freienwalde. It was part of It is one of the few villages of the historic Neumark region still in Germany after 1945. 

It is the site of a border crossing on the main road connecting Bad Freienwalde, Germany with Chojna, Poland (formerly the German town of Königsberg in der Neumark). The adjacent Polish village is called Osinów Dolny - which, when it used to be part of Germany, was called Niederwutzen; the toponyms Hohen- and Nieder- indicate "upper" and "lower" respectively. The name of the Polish settlement is a calque of the old German name.

Villages in Brandenburg
Localities in Märkisch-Oderland
Germany–Poland border crossings